Utricularia praetermissa is a medium-sized epiphyte or terrestrial carnivorous plant that belongs to the genus Utricularia. U. praetermissa is endemic to Central America, where it is found in Costa Rica, Nicaragua, and Panama. It was originally published and described by Peter Taylor in 1977. It flowers between July and October.

See also 
 List of Utricularia species

References 

Carnivorous plants of Central America
Epiphytes
Flora of Costa Rica
Flora of Nicaragua
Flora of Panama
praetermissa